Jannali railway station is located on the Illawarra line, serving the Sydney suburb of Jannali. It is served by Sydney Trains T4 line services.

History
Jannali station opened on 7 February 1931. The development was requested and largely funded by Sutherland Shire Council. The road bridge over the railway at Jannali was constructed at the same time as the station.

A minor upgrade was completed in April 2013. Improvements included redesigning and rebuilding the ramp on the western side of the station and upgrading the footpath on the eastern side of the station.

The station received a more substantial upgrade in 2017, when a footbridge with lifts was built.

Platforms & services

Transport links
Transdev NSW operates two bus routes via Jannali station:
967: Westfield Miranda to Oyster Bay & Como West
968: Westfield Miranda  to Kareela & Bonnet Bay

References

External links

Jannali station details Transport for New South Wales

Easy Access railway stations in Sydney
Railway stations in Sydney
Railway stations in Australia opened in 1931
Illawarra railway line
Sutherland Shire